Thomas Hayes (22 February 1890 – 19 February 1967) was an Australian politician. He was the Labor Party member for Melbourne in the Victorian Legislative Assembly from 1924 to 1955.

Hayes was born in Ararat, Victoria to an Irish railway worker, Patrick Hayes, and his wife Sarah. He was educated at St Mary's School, and then followed his father into the railway industry, joining the Ararat branch of Victorian Railways, and was later transferred to Melbourne. During the early 1920s, he was president of the shunters section and later the transportation sections of the Australian Railways Union.

At the 1924 state election, he was elected to the seat of Melbourne for the Labor Party. He was also a councillor on the Melbourne City Council from 1939 to 1965. When the government of John Cain took office in December 1952, Hayes was appointed to the Cain Ministry as Minister-in-Charge of Housing and the associated portfolio of Minister-in-Charge of Materials.

In March 1955, Hayes left the ALP in the 1955 split and joined the Australian Labor Party (Anti-Communist)—relinquishing his ministerial portfolio to John Sheehan. He was defeated in the 1955 state election, but remained active in the Democratic Labor Party, serving as deputy leader in Victoria in 1961.

References

1890 births
1967 deaths
Members of the Victorian Legislative Assembly
Australian Labor Party members of the Parliament of Victoria
Democratic Labor Party (historical) politicians
Australian people of Irish descent
Australian Roman Catholics
Australian people in rail transport
Trade unionists from Melbourne
Australian Labor Party (Anti-Communist) members of the Parliament of Victoria
20th-century Australian politicians
People from Ararat, Victoria
Victoria (Australia) politicians
Burials in Victoria (Australia)